Cecil Duane Crabb (May 23, 1890 – April 27, 1953) was an American composer of ragtime music and a member of Indianapolis group of ragtime composers.

He was born in Centerville, Indiana to James and Sarah E. Crabb. He moved to Indianapolis in 1908. Crabb composed only four albeit significant ragtime pieces including his best known Fluffly Ruffles from 1907. He had a job at a small publishing firm J.H. Aufderheide & Company that published ragtime by Indianapolis composers. Originally a sign painter, he had also designed cover art for ragtimes of Aufderheide composers, such as May Aufderheide (Dusty Rag) and Will B. Morrison.  His primary career was in the sign business as co-owner for many years of the Indianapolis firm Staley and Crabb, now known as Staley Signs. He died in Wisconsin at the age of 62 and was buried at Crown Hill Cemetery in Indianapolis.  He had  three children, one of whom became Brig. General Cecil D. Crabb.

List of compositions

 Fluffly Ruffles - Two Step (1907)
 Orinoco (1909)
 Trouble (1909, with Will B. Morrison)
 The Klassicle Rag (1911)

References
 Biography at ragpiano.com

Further reading

External links

 

1890 births
1953 deaths
American male composers
Ragtime composers
American music publishers (people)
People from Centerville, Indiana
Burials at Crown Hill Cemetery
20th-century American composers
20th-century American male musicians